The Greater Moldova Party, known before 2020 as the "For the Nation and Country Party", is a political party in Moldova.

History 
The party was formed on 5 May 2007 in Ratuș, Criuleni; Tudor Deliu was elected as the president of the party. It was registered at the Ministry of Justice on 17 July 2007. Between this day and 21 January 2009, the official name of the party was Mișcarea social-politică "Pentru Neam și Țară". Teodor Turta is the current president of the party. In 2020, it was renamed from the "For the Nation and Country Party" to the "Greater Moldova Party".

The party won 0.28% of the votes at the 2010 parliamentary election, dropping to 0.11% in 2014.

See also 
Greater Moldova

References

External links
 ppnt.md
Organele de conducere ale Partidului "Pentru Neam și Țară" (PpNȚ) 
Vocea Basarabiei, (AUDIO) Partidul "Pentru Neam și Țară" susține Alianța "Moldova Noastră" și în actuala campanie. Scris de Nadejda Fotescu 
Timpul de dimineață, Partidul Pentru Neam și Țară - pentru Alianța Moldova Noastră! 
Ultima oră! Partidul "Pentru Neam și Țară" s-a retras din cursa electorală în favoarea Alianței Moldova Noastră

Political parties established in 2007
Moldovan irredentism